The Hermann Trophy is awarded annually by the Missouri Athletic Club to the United States's top men's and women's college soccer players.

History
In 1967, Bob Hermann, the president of the National Professional Soccer League (NPSL) and the Chairman of the Executive Committee of the NPSL's successor, the North American Soccer League, established a trophy to annually recognize the top men's collegiate soccer player.  The trophy, named the Hermann Trophy, has been awarded each year since 1967.  In 1988, a second Hermann Trophy was inaugurated to recognize the top women's collegiate player of the year.

In 1986, the Missouri Athletic Club (MAC) began naming an annual player of the year as a rival to the Hermann Trophy.  Then in 1996, the National Soccer Coaches Association of America (NSCAA) initiated its own annual player of the year award.  These three competing awards began merging three years later when the NSCAA and MAC agreed to cooperate on naming a combined collegiate player of the year.  Finally, beginning in 2002, the MAC/NSCAA and Hermann Trophy organization merged to create a unified trophy for the top college soccer player of the year.

The original Hermann Award Trophy is on display in the Hermann Atrium located in the McDonnell Athletic Center at MICDS in Ladue, Missouri.  The original trophy was donated to the school by Hermann in 2003.

The current MAC Hermann Trophy is on display in the lobbies of the Missouri Athletic Club's Downtown and West County Clubhouses.

Selection process
Today, the process of selecting a winner begins at the start of the college soccer season when a list of potential nominees is compiled by a nominating committee.  Near the end of the collegiate regular season, 15 players whom the committee considers the best in Division I soccer are announced as semifinalists for the award.  That list is then voted on through an online voting process by men's and women's Division I soccer coaches whose teams are current NSCAA College Services members.  In early December the top three vote-getters for both the men's and women's trophy are announced as finalists for the award. These six individuals are invited to an annual banquet held at the Missouri Athletic Club of St. Louis.  That evening, the winners of the two awards are announced and receive a 10-pound crystal replica soccer ball made by Tyrone Crystal of County Tyrone, Northern Ireland.

Hermann Trophy (men's)

 Unified with Hermann Trophy Award
 Unified with MAC Award
 Not awarded

Hermann Trophy (women's)

 Unified with Hermann Trophy Award
 Unified with MAC Award
 Not awarded

See also
Soccer America Player of the Year Award
TopDrawerSoccer.com National Player of the Year Award
ISAA Player of the Year (discontinued)
 List of sports awards honoring women

References

External links
MAC Hermann Trophy (official website)
MAC Hermann Trophy (MAC website)

 
College soccer trophies and awards in the United States
US, College H
Awards established in 1967
Women's association football player of the year awards